The Fraunhofer distance, named after Joseph von Fraunhofer, is the value of:

This distance provides the limit between the near and far field.

See also 
 Fresnel number
 Fresnel diffraction and Fraunhofer diffraction
 Antenna measurement

Diffraction
Antennas
Antennas (radio)